Shruti Sharma may refer to:

 Shruti Sharma (born 1981), Indian model and actress
 Shruti Sharma (actress) (born 1994), Indian actress

See also
 Shruti (disambiguation)